XHMMS-FM is a radio station on 97.9 FM in Mazatlán, Sinaloa. It carries the FM Globo romantic format from MVS Radio.

History
XEMMS-AM 1000 received its concession on April 10, 1987. The 1 kW daytimer was operated by Grupo ACIR and known as Radio ACIR before changing to an oldies format under its Radio Felicidad brand.

In 2009 MegaRadio began operating the station. Initially, it retained the oldies format under the name "Tu Recuerdo" (Your Memory), but the station soon became a franchise of the Ke buena Regional Mexican format from Televisa Radio.

It was authorized to move to FM in 2011. In 2018, Ke Buena moved to XHST-FM 94.7, and XHMMS-FM became La Bestia Grupera.

RSN took over operation on March 30, 2020, with the FM Globo romantic format from MVS Radio.

References

Radio stations in Sinaloa
Radio stations established in 1987
1987 establishments in Mexico